Romance of the Sea was a clipper ship launched in 1853. She was "the last extreme clipper ship built by Donald McKay for the California trade". Her original figurehead was "a small female figure, intended to represent Romance, with the name of [Sir Walter] Scott on one side, and [James Fenimore] Cooper on the other - the greatest romancers of the century". She lost that figurehead during a storm on her third voyage.

In her nine year life, Romance of the Sea made six round-trip voyages from North Atlantic ports before being lost during her seventh voyage.

Her voyages

The Romance of the Sea'''s voyages are listed here. Sources disagree on some items; disagreements or ambiguities are individually cited. City names are as they were at the time.

Artifacts
Donald McKay's original half-hull working model is held by the Museum of Fine Arts Boston.
Sailing cards advertising Romance's first two voyages to San Francisco are held by the Francis Russell Hart Nautical Museum of MIT. The one for the first voyage is reproduced in Yankee Ship Sailing Cards''.

Notes

References

See also
List of clipper ships

Ships built in Boston
Ships designed by Donald McKay
Extreme clippers